is a former Japanese football player and manager. He played for Japan national team.

Club career
Matsumoto was born in Utsunomiya on November 3, 1941. After graduating from high school, he joined Toyo Industries in 1964. In 1965, Toyo Industries joined new league Japan Soccer League. The club won league champions in 1965, 1966, 1967, 1968 and 1970. The club also won 1965, 1967 and 1969 Emperor's Cup. He retired in 1973. He played 88 games and scored 31 goals in the league. He was selected Best Eleven in 1966.

National team career
In December 1966, Matsumoto was selected Japan national team for 1966 Asian Games. At this competition, on December 10, he debuted against India. In 1968, he was selected Japan for 1968 Summer Olympics in Mexico City. He played 4 matches and Japan won Bronze Medal. In 2018, this team was selected Japan Football Hall of Fame. He played 11 games and scored 1 goal for Japan until 1969.

Coaching career
After retirement, Matsumoto became a manager for Toyo Industries as Kenzo Ohashi successor in 1976. He also named a manager for Japan U-20 national team. He managed at 1979 World Youth Championship in Japan. In April 1999, he signed with J2 League club Kawasaki Frontale. He led the club to won the champions and promoted to J1 League. In 2004, he signed with Sagan Tosu and managed in 3 seasons. In 2009, he was selected Japan Football Hall of Fame. In 2010, he became a manager for Sagan Tosu again. In September 2013, when he was 71 years old, he signed with Tochigi SC. He became the first manager for the 70s in J.League.

National team statistics

Managerial statistics

Awards
 Japan Soccer League Best Eleven: 1966
 Japan Soccer League Star Ball Award: 1966

References

External links

 
 Japan National Football Team Database

Japan Football Hall of Fame at Japan Football Association
Japan Football Hall of Fame (Japan team at 1968 Olympics) at Japan Football Association

1941 births
Living people
Waseda University alumni
Association football people from Tochigi Prefecture
Japanese footballers
Japan international footballers
Japan Soccer League players
Sanfrecce Hiroshima players
Olympic footballers of Japan
Olympic medalists in football
Olympic bronze medalists for Japan
Footballers at the 1968 Summer Olympics
Medalists at the 1968 Summer Olympics
Asian Games medalists in football
Asian Games bronze medalists for Japan
Footballers at the 1966 Asian Games
Japanese football managers
J2 League managers
Kawasaki Frontale managers
Sagan Tosu managers
Tochigi SC managers
Association football forwards
Medalists at the 1966 Asian Games